Janet Gover (b. Melbourne, Australia) is an Australian writer of over a dozen romance novels  and more than 20 short stories since 2002. Her work has won numerous awards in the UK and the US, including the Romantic Novelists' Association's Epic Romantic Novel of the Year (2017) and  Elizabeth Goudge Trophy (2007).

She also writes as Juliet Bell, in collaboration with English author Alison May.

She worked as a television journalist in Australia and Hong Kong and the UK before moving to the UK. She was Publicity Officer for the Romantic Novelists' Association in 2010.

Biography
Janet Gover was born in Melbourne, Australia, and grew up in a small country town in Queensland.

After studying  Journalism and Politics at Queensland University, she became a television journalist, first in Brisbane and then Sydney before moving to Hong Kong and London. She was an on-the-road reporter, covering everything from natural disasters to visiting movie stars. She became a specialist crime and court reporter before changing her focus to politics. After several years as a reporter, she moved behind the camera to become a programme producer, and assignments editor.

Her first fiction was a short story, published in 2002. She is a well regarded creative writing tutor and frequently speaks to writing groups and conferences.

Married to an Englishman, she lives in London.

Bibliography

Short stories
The Last Dragon (2002)
The Reunion Concert (2002)
Where The Heart Is (2002) a.k.a. The Brown Pony
Home of the Dragon (2002) a.k.a. The Last Dragon
A Bush Christmas (2003)
A Song in His Heart (2003)
Pot Luck (2003) a.k.a. House Rules
´Tis The Season (2003)
New Beginnings (2004)
To Love and To Cherish (2004) a.k.a. Snapshot in Time
My Hero (2007) a.k.a. The Romance Writer
Do You believe in Fairy Tales (2007) a.k.a. Fairy Godmothers Need Not Apply
Do You Believe In Fairies? (2008) a.k.a. Fairy Kiss
Homeward Bound (2008)
A Heavenly Child (2009) 
The Homecoming (2009)
Waiting For a Wish (2009)
Genesis II (2010)
Sweet Memory (2013)
A Piece of Cake (2014)
The Cat Who Talked to Ghosts (2016)
The Road West (2016)
Second Chances (2016)

Novels
The Farmer Needs a Wife (2009)
The Bachelor and Spinster Ball (2009)
Girl Racers (2010)
Bring Me Sunshine (2013)
Flight To Coorah Creek (2014)
The Wild One (Coorah Creek series book 2) (2015)
Christmas at Coorah Creek (Coorah Creek series book 3) (2015)
Little Girl Lost (Coorah Creek series book 4) (2016)
Wedding Bells by The Creek (Coorah Creek series book 5) (2017)
Marrying The Rebel Prince (2018)
The Lawson Sisters (2020)
Close To Home (2021)
Writing as Juliet Bell: 
The Heights (2018) 
The Other Wife (2018)

References and sources

Living people
Australian romantic fiction writers
Australian women novelists
Women romantic fiction writers
Writers from Melbourne
Year of birth missing (living people)
University of Queensland alumni